Łążyn  (German Lonzyn) is a village in the administrative district of Gmina Zławieś Wielka, within Toruń County, Kuyavian-Pomeranian Voivodeship, in north-central Poland.

Notable people
Moritz von Rohr (1868–1940), optical scientist

References

Villages in Toruń County